The Netherlands Football League Championship 1909–1910 was contested by seventeen teams participating in two divisions. The national champion would be determined by a play-off featuring the winners of the eastern and western football division of the Netherlands. HVV Den Haag won this year's championship by beating Quick Nijmegen 2-0 and 3–2.

New entrant
Eerste Klasse East:
Quick Nijmegen returned after one season of absence

Divisions

Eerste Klasse East

Eerste Klasse West

Championship play-off

HVV Den Haag won the championship.

References
RSSSF Netherlands Football League Championships 1898-1954
RSSSF Eerste Klasse Oost
RSSSF Eerste Klasse West

Netherlands Football League Championship seasons
1909–10 in Dutch football
Netherlands